The Churches Conservation Trust, which was initially known as the Redundant Churches Fund, is a charity whose purpose is to protect historic churches at risk, those that have been made redundant by the Church of England. The Trust was established by the Pastoral Measure of 1968. The legally defined object of the Trust is "the preservation, in the interests of the nation and the Church of England, of churches and parts of churches of historic and archaeological interest or architectural quality vested in the Fund ... together with their contents so vested".

The Trust cares for over 350 churches.  The charity is financed partly by the Department for Culture, Media and Sport and the Church Commissioners, but grants from those bodies were frozen in 2001, since when additional funding has come from other sources, including the general public. During the 2016-2017 period, the Trust's income was £9,184,283 and expenditures totaled £9,189,061; 92% of the latter was spent on front line projects. During that year it had 64 employees, and received the support of up to 2,000 volunteers. The charity is run by a board of trustees, who delegate the day-to-day management to a chief executive and his senior management team.

The Trust's primary aim is to ensure that the buildings in its care are weatherproof and to prevent any deterioration in their condition.  The majority of the churches remain consecrated, and many are occasionally still used for worship.  Local communities are encouraged to use them for appropriate activities and events, and the buildings provide an educational resource, allowing children and young people to study history and architecture. Nearly 2 million people visit the Trust's churches each year.

This list describes the 50 churches cared for by the Churches Conservation Trust in Northern England, covering the counties of Northumberland, Tyne and Wear, Cumbria, North Yorkshire, South Yorkshire, West Yorkshire, Lancashire, Merseyside, Greater Manchester, and Cheshire, spanning a period of more than 1,000 years. The oldest is St Andrew's Church, Bywell, which dates from about 850; the most recent, Old Christ Church, Waterloo, was built between 1891 and 1894.  All but one of the churches have been designated by English Heritage as listed buildings.

Some stand in the centres of cities or towns and their functions have been taken over by nearby churches; these include St John the Evangelist's Church, Lancaster, Christ Church, Macclesfield, St John the Evangelist's Church, Leeds, St Stephen's Church, Low Elswick, Church of All Souls, Bolton, and Old Christ Church, Waterloo.  Others stand in remote or isolated positions in the countryside. Some fell into disuse because the village they served was deserted, or the local population moved elsewhere; examples include Ireby Old Church, St Mary's Chapel, Lead, and St Thomas' Church, Friarmere. Alternatively the church once served the estate of a country house, as with All Saints' Church, Harewood, Church of Christ the Consoler, Skelton-on-Ure, and St Martin's Church, Allerton Mauleverer.

In some cases the churches have only been partially conserved.  Only the tower of Old St Lawrence, York (standing within the churchyard of St. Lawrence Parish Church), the tower and part of the aisle walls of Christ Church, Heaton Norris, and the tower, chancel and walls of the nave of Old Holy Trinity Church, Wentworth have survived.  Most of the churches remain consecrated and are used for occasional services where practical; some are venues for concerts and other purposes.  One church still vested in the Trust, St James, Toxteth, Liverpool, which was at one time derelict, re-opened in 2010 for regular worship.

Key

Churches

See also
List of churches preserved by the Churches Conservation Trust in the East of England
List of churches preserved by the Churches Conservation Trust in the English Midlands
List of churches preserved by the Churches Conservation Trust in Southeast England
List of churches preserved by the Churches Conservation Trust in Southwest England

Notes

This is the period, or where possible the date, of the earliest existing part of the building (excluding small amounts of fabric or re-used material).

References

Bibliography